Nils Middelboe (5 October 1887 – 21 September 1976) was a Danish amateur track and field athlete and football player as well as a football referee and leader. He represented the Denmark national football team at the 1908, 1912 and 1920 Summer Olympics, winning silver medals in 1908 and 1912. He was the first ever goalscorer for the Danish national football team, when he scored in Denmark's debut game at the 1908 Summer Olympics. In 1913, he moved abroad to play for English club Chelsea, and became the first foreign player to ever represent the club.

Personal life
Middelboe was an amateur footballer throughout his career. He was a qualified lawyer and during his time at Chelsea he was employed at a bank in London. He would have gained thrice the salary as solely a professional footballer than he did as a banker-cum-amateur footballer, but he was (in his own words) "by no means mad about football". So as not to interfere with his career, Middelboe played in all home games, but was not required to travel to away games while at Chelsea. Middelboe was a man of great height for his time (standing at 6 foot 2 inches), which led to the media naming him "The Great Dane". He was also well respected as a gentleman of the game. He is buried in the Cemetery of Holmen in Copenhagen.

Career
Middelboe was born in Brunnby, Sweden. He made his senior debut for Kjøbenhavns Boldklub (KB) in 1903, at the age of 16. At KB, he played alongside his older brothers Einar Middelboe and Kristian Middelboe, of whom Kristian also played for the Danish national team. From 1904 to 1913 Nils won five KBU football championships with KB, while he also excelled in athletics competitions. He was a Danish triple jump and 4 x 100 metres relay champion, and he set Danish records in the 800 metres (with a time of 2:05.2) and triple jump (13.29 m).

Occupying the half-back role, he won silver medals with Denmark in both the 1908 and 1912 Olympic Games, the latter as captain of the side. His goal against France in 1908 was the first ever goal scored by an official national team in Olympic football. Middelboe won his 11th cap for Denmark in a friendly against Sweden, at the time this made him Denmark's all-time leading appearance maker. In all, he played 15 games and scored 7 goals for the Danish national team from 1908 to 1920. The three times Middelboe played for his country while at Chelsea, he always represented KB, as opposed to Chelsea.

Nils Middelboe is renowned as the first non-British international to play for Chelsea, during his stint at the club between 1913 and 1923. Originally he had signed for Newcastle United; however, with the permission of the Newcastle Director, he switched to Chelsea. He made his debut on 15 November 1913 against Derby County at Stamford Bridge - a 2–1 win for Chelsea. As a show of faith from the players, he was appointed captain, despite never having previously played for the Chelsea first team. In all, he played 46 matches for Chelsea until 1922.

After his days at Chelsea, he played for the amateur sides of Corinthian F.C. and Casuals F.C. until 1926. In 1929 he was appointed a Director of the English League Division Three south East London based side Clapton Orient. He returned to Denmark in 1936. It was through Middelboe's contacts in English football, that English coach Edward Magner was hired to coach the Danish national team in 1939. As an interpreter, Middelboe mediated Magner's tactical instructions on the modern WM formation to the team, a formation Middelboe himself was a known critic of.

As a coach for KB, he led the team to the Danish football championship in 1940. In April 1946, Chelsea played KB in a friendly, arranged to celebrate that club's 70th anniversary. The chairman of KB announced that, owing to Middelboe's "long and happy association" with Chelsea, there was no other club they would rather be facing.

Honours

As a player
 Danish championship: 1913

As a manager 
 Danish championship: 1940

References

Literature
Glanvill, Rick (2005). Chelsea FC: The Official Biography - The Definitive Story of the First 100 Years. Headline Book Publishing Ltd. .
 Allan Nielsen, "Den Første ...", Politiken article, 6 January 1997
 Neilson N. Kaufman, honorary historian, Leyton Orient Football Club -

External links
Danish national team profile

1887 births
1976 deaths
Association football midfielders
Danish men's footballers
Denmark international footballers
Danish male triple jumpers
Danish male sprinters
Danish male middle-distance runners
Olympic footballers of Denmark
Kjøbenhavns Boldklub players
Casuals F.C. players
Chelsea F.C. players
Corinthian F.C. players
Footballers at the 1908 Summer Olympics
Footballers at the 1912 Summer Olympics
Footballers at the 1920 Summer Olympics
Olympic silver medalists for Denmark
Danish football referees
Naturalised citizens of Denmark
Expatriate footballers in England
Olympic medalists in football
Medalists at the 1912 Summer Olympics
Medalists at the 1908 Summer Olympics
Danish expatriate sportspeople in England
Burials at Holmen Cemetery
Sportspeople from Frederiksberg